Window on the World was a 1949 American variety show.

Window on the World or Windows on the World may also refer to:

 Windows on the World, a restaurant at the top of the North Tower, Building One of the original World Trade Center
 Windows on the World (film), a 2019 film starring Edward James Olmos
 Windows on the World (novel), a 2005 novel by Frederic Beigbeder
 "The Windows of the World" (song), song by Dionne Warwick
 BBC Two 'Window on the World' idents
 Window on the World, a 2011 novel by Hugh Cornwell
 Studio 1A at the NBC headquarters complex in New York City

See also
 Window to the World (WTTW), a public television station
 Window of the World, a theme park in Shenzhen, China